Vaughan is a community in the Canadian province of Nova Scotia, located in the Municipal District of West Hants. The South Canoe Wind Energy Project is proposed for this area.

References

Communities in Hants County, Nova Scotia
General Service Areas in Nova Scotia